Padmashree Sahitya Puraskar is an annual literary prize in Nepali literature, presented by Khemlal-Harikala Lamichhane Samaaj Kalyan Pratisthan. The award is given to a book that has provided a great contribution in the field of Nepali literature. This award is given alongside Padmashree Sadhana Samman.

History 
The award was established in 2006 (2063 BS) by writer and businessman Jiba Lamichhane. He founded the organization Khemlal-Harikala Lamichhane Samaaj Kalyan Pratisthan in honor of his parents. Ganesh Rasik was the first winner of the award.

List of Winners and nominations

2021 onwards

2006 – 2020

Monetary Prize 
The winner of the honor was rewarded with रु100,000 initially. It was then increased to रु200,000. Since 2076 BS, the prize money is रु300,000. Since the honor was given to two writers in 2071, 2067 and 2066 each, the prize money was divided in half.

Controversy 
The award was cancelled for the year 2076, after writer Sanjeev Uprety declined to accept the award. He decided to withdraw due to the allegations regarding the Padmashree Sadhana Samman winner, Modanath Prasit.

See also 

 Madan Puraskar
 Jagadamba Shree Puraskar
 Sajha Puraskar

References

Notes 

 
 

Awards established in 2006
Nepalese literary awards